Last Battle of the Icemark is the Third and presumably final book in the Icemark Chronicles by English author Stuart Hill. It was released on the 7 July 2008 in the United Kingdom and was released on 15 April 2009 in the US. It is currently out of print in the United Kingdom.

Plot
Two years have passed since The Icemark managed to defeat the Polypontian Empire in Blade of Fire. This has caused the Polypontians to break up and many civil wars have started to take their place. With the defeat of the Polypontians at the end of the second book, there is now another enemy of the Icemark. That settles on Erinor of Artemision and her dinosaur cavalry of Tri-horns, creatures described to look like warrior Triceratops, and Oskan's father Cronus, his Ice Demons and his granddaughter, Medea. 
Erinor's dinosaur cavalry move in on what remains of the Polypontian Empire, fully intending to move on to the Icemark afterward and to murder anyone that has a bloodline containing that of the northern Hypolitan. Responding to a plea for help from the Empire, a reluctant Thirrin leads her army into the heart of what was once enemy territory in order to prevent them from invading Icemark as well. Thirrin's strong prejudice against the Polypontians is transformed upon meeting their emperor, who is only a young boy, not yet in his teens, and she realizes that everything she hated about their Empire came from the Bellorum clan. However, by invading the Empire to confront Erinor, the Icemark is left open for an invasion from the Darkness (Cronus and his ice demons). 
While Icemark and their allies are gone, oblivious to the attack, the Vampire Queen defends Icemark in hopes of being given a soul, as her husband was for loving her. When the other vampires hear the undead may have souls, they are willing to sacrifice themselves for the Icemark, and therefore able to delay Medea and Cronus. 
Pious, an imp that has learned the power of friendship and love, is able to give Oskan and Thirrin the warning of the attack after they have defeated Erinor and her armies. 
Oskan, entrusted with the (until that point) secret knowledge that says that Dark Adepts cannot kill the ones they love without dying, defeats Cronus and Medea, though at the cost of his own life.

Characters 

 Oskan
 Thirrin
 Medea
 Orla
 Cronus
 Kirimin
 Mekhmet
 Sharley (Charlemagne)
 Arc-Adepts (Cronus')

See also

References

2005 British novels
British fantasy novels
The Icemark Chronicles
The Chicken House books